Mandiant is an American cybersecurity firm and a subsidiary of Google. It rose to prominence in February 2013 when it released a report directly implicating China in cyber espionage. In December 2013, Mandiant was acquired by FireEye for $1 billion, who eventually sold the FireEye product line, name, and its employees to Symphony Technology Group for $1.2 billion in June 2021.

In March 2022, Google announced that it would acquire the company for $5.4billion and integrate it into its Google Cloud division, with the firm becoming fully incorporated in September 2022.

Founding 
Kevin Mandia, a former United States Air Force officer who serves as the company's chief executive officer, founded Mandiant as Red Cliff Consulting in 2004 before rebranding to its current name in 2006. In 2011, Mandiant received funding from Kleiner Perkins Caufield & Byers and One Equity Partners to expand its staff and grow its business-to-business operations, providing incident response and general security consulting along with incident management products to major global organizations, governments, and Fortune 100 companies.

History 
Mandiant is the creator of OpenIOC (Open Indicators of Compromise), an extensible XML schema for the description of technical characteristics that identify threats, security hackers' methodologies, and evidence of compromise. In 2012, its revenues were over $100 million, up 76% from 2011.

In February 2013, Mandiant released a report documenting evidence of cyber attacks by the People's Liberation Army, specifically Pudong-based PLA Unit 61398, targeting at least 141 organizations in the United States and other English-speaking countries extending as far back as 2006. In the report, Mandiant referred to the espionage unit as "APT1".

In December 2013, Mandiant was acquired by FireEye for $1 billion. In October 2020, the company announced Mandiant Advantage, a subscription-based SaaS platform designed to augment and automate security response teams which combined the threat intelligence gathered by Mandiant and data from cyber incident response engagements; in December, the company investigated a major supply chain attack by SolarWinds on U.S. government infrastructure.

In May 2021, Mandiant was contracted to assist in the response to a ransomware incident impacting Colonial Pipeline, a fuel pipeline operator that supplies close to half of the gasoline, diesel, and other fuels to the East Coast of the U.S. In June, the company was spun off FireEye as part of the latter's acquisition by Symphony Technology Group. In August, the company acquired Intrigue, which specialized in surface management.

In 2022, Axios reported that Mandiant reporters identified a pro-China disinformation campaign targeting American voters ahead of the 2022 midterm elections.

Acquisition by Google 
In March 2022, it was announced that the company would be acquired by Google for $5.4 billion and subsequently integrated into the Google Cloud division. Following the announcement, Fortune reported that while the deal could face antitrust scrutiny, the acquisition "could help increase competition" rather than harm it.

In April 2022, it was reported that the Department of Justice (DOJ) Antitrust Division was probing the deal for potential violations of federal antitrust law. However, Mandiant revealed in July 2022 that the DOJ granted the acquisition approval. Following a review over potential competition concerns, the Australian Competition & Consumer Commission (ACCC) announced it would not oppose the deal.

On September 12, 2022, the deal closed and integration between Mandiant and Google Cloud began. Following the acquisition, Mandiant was allowed to maintain its brand as a subsidiary of Google Cloud.

References

External links 
 

2004 establishments in Virginia
2022 mergers and acquisitions
American companies established in 2004
Companies based in Alexandria, Virginia
Companies formerly listed on the Nasdaq
Computer security software companies
Google acquisitions
Google Cloud
Software companies based in Virginia
Software companies established in 2004